Publicis New York (formerly Publicis Kaplan Thaler) is an American advertising agency based in New York City. The agency created the Aflac duck, Herbal Essences Totally Organic Experience, Continental Airlines “Work Hard. Fly Right.", and Swiffer Sweeper campaigns.

History
On July 12, 2012, Publicis Kaplan Thaler was formed in the merger of Publicis Worldwide's Publicis New York and Publicis Groupe's Kaplan Thaler Group. The combined New York-based entity, with over 650 employees, became the U.S. flagship agency within the Publicis Worldwide network of over 200 offices in 82 countries.

On June 30, 2015, Publicis Kaplan Thaler shortened its name to Publicis New York and officially put the PKT name and KTG agency to rest. The Publicis agency would renovate KTG's original 3 floors at 1675 Broadway and expand to other floors, replacing the brightly colored walls, carpet and Lego wall with a sea of red carpet squares and open office workspaces.  The space has been expanded to 8 floors of open-seating in the Activity-Based Working framework, designed by the award-winning Clive Wilkinson. The space won in the Large Office category for Interior Design's awards in 2018.

Works 
Publicis New York's capabilities are digital marketing—such as web development, social media, mobile, and online advertising—direct response, television, print, radio, and out of home. The agency created the Aflac duck, Herbal Essences Totally Organic Experience, Continental Airlines “Work Hard. Fly Right.", and Swiffer Sweeper campaigns.

Acquired entities

Kaplan Thaler Group 
The Kaplan Thaler Group was founded in 1997.

Publications
Previous CEO and Chief Creative Officer, Linda Kaplan Thaler and President Robin Koval are the authors of three books:
 BANG! Getting Your Message Heard in a Noisy World (Random House, 2003)
 THE POWER OF NICE: How to Conquer the Business World with Kindness (Random House, 2006)
 THE POWER OF SMALL: Why Little Things Make All the Difference (Doubleday, 2009)

References

External links
 Publicis  Official Website

Advertising agencies of the United States
Companies based in New York City
Publicis Groupe
1997 establishments in New York City